Abu Suwir El Mahata, also called Abu Suweir, is a city in the Ismailia Governorate, Egypt. Its population was estimated at about 30,300 people in 2018.

References 

Populated places in Ismailia Governorate